Frellsen is an unincorporated community  in St. Charles Parish, Louisiana, United States.

References

Unincorporated communities in St. Charles Parish, Louisiana
Unincorporated communities in Louisiana
Unincorporated communities in New Orleans metropolitan area
Louisiana populated places on the Mississippi River